Satlsar (also Romanized as Saţlsar and Saţlesar) is a village in Layl Rural District, in the Central District of Lahijan County, Gilan Province, Iran. At the 2006 census, its population was 1,020, in 307 families.

References 

Populated places in Lahijan County